Damude is a surname. Notable people with the surname include:

Arthur Damude (1889–1941), Canadian politician in Ontario
Nicola Correia-Damude (born 1981), Canadian actress and singer